Events in the year 1918 in Norway.

Incumbents
Monarch – Haakon VII

Events

 Norsk Hydro's artificial fertilizer production at Glomfjord is bought by the Norwegian government. In 1947 it is leased back to Hydro. This activity is  Yara International.
 The 1918 Parliamentary election takes place.

Popular culture

Sports

Gunnar Andersen, international soccer player and ski jumper, becomes the first to receive the Egebergs Ærespris, an award presented to Norwegian athletes who excel at two (or more) different sports.

Music

Film

Literature
 The Olav Duun novel Juvikingar (The Trough of the Waves) from the work Juvikfolket (The People of Juvik, 1918–23), was published.
 The Knut Hamsund article collection Sproget i Fare (The language in Danger), was published.

Notable births

2 January – Odd Vattekar, politician (died 1992)
11 January – Gunnar Sønsteby, resistance fighter, the most highly decorated person in Norway (died 2012)
27 January – Lars Ulgenes, shot putter (died 2005)
30 January – André Bjerke, writer and poet (died 1985)
1 February – Elsa Rastad Bråten, politician (died 1999)
11 February – Anne Stine Ingstad, archaeologist (died 1997)
16 February – Karsten Konow, sailor and Olympic silver medallist (died 1943)
20 March – Oddvar Berrefjord, jurist, politician and Minister (died 1999)
14 April – Margit Tøsdal, politician (died 1993)
6 May – Eva Kolstad, politician and Minister (died 1999)
19 May – Olav Bø, folklorist (died 1998)
25 May – Peder Lunde, sailor and Olympic silver medallist (died 2009)
25 May – Fredrik Kayser, resistance fighter (died 2009)
10 June – Gerd Kirste, politician (died 2014)
15 June – Fartein Valen-Sendstad, historian and museologist (died 1984).
21 June – Kasper Idland, resistance member (died 1968)
2 July – Odd Sagør, politician and Minister (died 1993)
4 July – Rolf Søder, actor (died 1998)
9 July – Tor Tank-Nielsen, businessperson (died 2010)
12 July – Kåre Stokkeland, politician (died 1985)
2 August – Gunvald Tomstad, resistance fighter (died 1970)
18 August – Per Hafslund, zoologist, educator and broadcasting person (died 1990)
19 August – Bjørn Egge, military officer (died 2007)
8 September – Kjølv Egeland, politician (died 1999)
18 September – Berit Brænne, actress and children's writer (died 1976)
8 October – Halfdan Hegtun, radio personality, comedian, writer and politician (died 2012)
15 October – Rolf Schjerven, politician (died 1978)
27 October – Jens-Anton Poulsson, military officer (died 2010)
9 November – Aslaug Fredriksen, politician (died 2000)
9 November – Sverre Granlund, commando (died 1943)
13 November – Karl Aasland, politician (died 1982)
16 November – Finn Ludt, pianist, composer and music critic (died 1992)
24 November – Torstein Grythe, founder and conductor of the Sølvguttene boys choir (died 2009)
8 December – Hans Børli, poet and writer (died 1989)
8 December – Carsten Byhring, actor (died 1990)

Full date unknown
Otto Chr. Bastiansen, physicist and chemist (died 1995)
Kåre Berven Fjeldsaa, ceramics designer (died 1991)
Kari Nyquist, ceramicist (died 2011)
Einar Skinnarland, resistance fighter (died 2002)

Notable deaths

26 February – Otto Jensen, bishop, politician and Minister (born 1856)
25 August – Karl Haagensen, gymnast and Olympic gold medallist (born 1871)

Full date unknown
Anders Heyerdahl, violinist, composer and folk music collector (born 1832)
Hans Mustad, businessperson (born 1837)
Dan Weggeland, artist (born 1827)

See also

References

External links

 
Norway
Norway